Bishrampur block is one of the administrative community development block of Palamu district, Jharkhand state, India. According to census (2001), the block has 15,419 households with aggregate population of 133,862. The block has 96 villages.

About Bishrampur Palamu Jharkhand
Bishrampur Taluka/Block, close to Medininager Palamu, is located 42 km from Medininagar (Daltonganj). Bishrampur has a separate Vidhan Sabha constituency. Bishrampur is located in north west of daltonganj. It is well connected via NH-98. It is  surrounded by mountains by every side, which make a beautiful place. It's well covered by Vodafone, Airtel, Uninor, Reliance, BSNL, Aircel, Idea, Airtel 3G, like cellular networks.

See also
 Palamu Loksabha constituency
 Jharkhand Legislative Assembly
 Jharkhand
 Palamu

References
Blocks of Palamu district

Community development blocks in Jharkhand
Community development blocks in Palamu district